Yiliang County is a county in the southeast of Yunnan Province, China, bordering the provinces of Sichuan to the northeast and Guizhou to the south. It is under the administration of the prefecture-level city of Zhaotong. In 2020 the population was 631,538 including 14.27% ethnic minorities, most of them Miao (59,920) and Yi (28,406).

It is the home county of general Luo Binghui (罗炳辉) and also known for the plant gastrodia elata.

Tourism 
Yiliang's main attractions are:

 Niujie Ancient Town
 Long and Ding manors
 Shoushi Mountain
 Traditional Miao villages

Administrative divisions 
The county seat is Juekui, it will be split into Juekui subdistrict and Fajie subdistrict (发界街道), pending approval from higher government organs.

Towns

 Juekui (角奎镇)
 Luozehe (洛泽河镇)
 Niujie (牛街镇)
 Haizi (海子镇)
 Qiaoshan (荞山镇)
 Long'an (龙安镇)
 Lianghe (两河镇)
 Zhongming (钟鸣镇)
 Xiaocaoba (小草坝镇)
 Longhai (龙海镇)

Townships

 Liuxi Miao ethnic township (柳溪苗族乡)
 Luowang Miao ethnic township (洛旺苗族乡)
 Longjie Miao and Yi ethnic township (龙街苗族彝族乡)
 Kuixiang Miao and Yi ethnic township (奎香苗族彝族乡)
 Shulin Yi and Miao ethnic township (树林彝族苗族乡)

Climate

References

External links
Yiliang County Official Website

County-level divisions of Zhaotong